Bunge is a populated area, a socken (not to be confused with parish), on the Swedish island of Gotland. It is situated in the northernmost part of Gotland, southwest of Fårösund. It comprises the same area as the administrative Bunge District, established on 1January 2016.

Geography 
Bunge is the name of the socken as well as the district. It is also the name of the small village surrounding the medieval Bunge Church, sometimes referred to as Bunge kyrkby. It is situated on the north coast of Gotland.

, Bunge Church belongs to Bunge-Rute-Fleringe parish in Norra Gotlands pastorat, along with the churches in Rute and Fleringe.

Places of interest 
Bunge has a private airfield, the Bunge Airbase. The hangar and the airfield are listed buildings.

Gotland's (and one of Sweden's) most noted open-air museum is the Bunge museum. The museum has farms from three centuries (17th, 18th and 19th) and is also very active in practical old industry such as recreating tar kilns and charcoal piles.

Gallery

References

Further reading

External links 

Objects from Bunge at the Digital Museum by Nordic Museum

Populated places in Gotland County